The Battle of Kishegyes (now Mali Iđoš, Vojvodina, Serbia) was a battle in the Hungarian Revolution of 1848, fought from 11 to 15 July 1849 between the Hungarian Revolutionary Army under the command of Antal Vetter and Richard Guyon and the Habsburg Corps under the Ban of Croatia Lieutenant Field Marshal Josip Jelačić in alliance with the Croatian and Serbian units. Jelačić, wanting to surprise the Hungarians with a night attack, accidentally run into their positions. The quickly reacting Hungarian troops attacked Jelačić's army, defeating it, and forcing it to retreat to the Titel plateau, fortified by the Serbians. Thanks to this victory the Hungarian retook the regions from Bácska lost after the Battle of Káty, and gained back the initiative on the Southern front.

Background
After the defeats from Káty from 7 June and Óbecse from 25 June, a new Hungarian main commander was named: Lieutenant General Antal Vetter, who installed his headquarters to Topolya. Profiting from Lieutenant Field Marshal Josip Jelačić's passivity, he started to reorganize his demoralized and weakened troops. On 12 July the Hungarian troops were reinforced by the division led by Major General György Kmety who retreated to the southern front from western Hungary after their defeat at the battle of Ihász from 27 June, and the Pereczy brigade, increasing the Hungarian armies size to 20 000 soldiers. After these positive developments, Vetter decided to attack Jelačić. He planned to do feigned attacks along the Ferenc Channel (Ferenc csatorna / K.K. Franzens Schiffahrts Canal) to attract Jelačić's attention on that direction, sending the Kmety division Westwards to cross the canal at Szivác and attack the Austrians from side at Kula, while the IV corps led by Richard Guyon had to attack them from the front. But Jelačić suspected that the Hungarians are planning something, and he also felt his position insecure, fearing that the Hungarian garrison from the fortress of Pétervárad can attack him from the back any time. On 5 July he sent the Ottinger cavalry brigade to Kishegyes, and the Horváth cavalry brigade to Zombor in reconnaissance.  The Ottinger brigade retreated to Verbász after a skirmish with the Hungarian units stationed at Kishegyes, and the Horváth brigade retreated from Zombor at 10 July, when the Kmety division arrived there. Seeing the Hungarians forces become stronger day by day, sensing that the division of Guyon stationing at Kishegyes will soon join with the Kmety division coming from Zombor, he felt that he has three options: to remain in defence alongside the Ferenc channel, exposing his troops to a Hungarian attack from the front or the back, to retreat to the fortified Titel plateau, or to attack the Hungarians before they joined their forces, and to defeat them in detail. He decided to attack first the Hungarian troops stationing at Kishegyes, Szeghegy and Feketehegy, which were the closest to him. In the case of a victory he hoped that his troops will be safe from Hungarian attack two-three more weeks, until Julius Jacob von Haynau's main Austrian army arrived from Komárom, as he calculated. Jelačić was aware of the dangers of his operation. To avoid the danger that in the case of a defeat, his troops to be cut from their retreat rout, and pushed in the waters of the Ferenc channel, he ordered to the Draskovich brigade which remained on the other side of the channel, to build a bridge at Futak, in order to come to the rescue if needed. He left two battalions and a battery at the following localities each: Bácsföldvár, Szenttamás, Verbász, and two cavalry companies at Kula to guard his crossing troops. He put all these units which he left behind under the leadership of Lieutenant General Kriegern. 

Guyon learned about Jelačić's attack plan, so he prepared a defence position centered on Kishegyes with his troops numbering around 8000, but he could not count on Kmety's 4000 soldiers, who were in a mission towards Kula.

Kishegyes, Szeghegy and Feketehegy lie in the steep valley of the Krivaja creek. Szeghegy is located on the right bank of Krivaja, while the other two villages are crossed by it. The position of the Hungarian troops led by General Guyon, intersected diagonally the Verbász-Kishegyes-Topolya road, on which Jellačić's troops were marching. Kishegyes and Szeghegy were by the Pereczi division, Feketehegy was guarded by the Igmándy division. The reserve remained at Topolya. Guyon calculated that if Jelačić's troops would attack him, his right wing from Kishegyes will tie down the attacker, while his center from Szeghegy and left wing from Feketehegy will attack the Ban from flank. 

On 14 July the Bánffy division was at Perlasz, on the other side of the river Tisza, quite opposite to the Titel plateau, far away from the future battlefield, but still they will have an indirect role in the battle.

Prelude
Jelačić's plan was that with a night attack to surprise the garrison from Kishegyes, occupy the village, then turn to the southeast, attack from the side of the garrisons from Szeghegy and Feketehegy.

Jelačić's troops departed on 13 July at 11 p.m.  On the front of his troops rode the Castiglione cavalry brigade, followed by the whole artillery. Right to them marched the Puffer infantry brigade, while on their left the Budissavljević infantry brigade, both from the Dietrich division. On the rear marched the Rastić infantry brigade, their left being secured by the Horváth cavalry brigade, while their right by a dragoon regiment. After an hour of march Jelačić received the report about enemy movements near Kucura, which lay 7 km from Kiskér, where his armies luggage was guarded, so he sent there three battalions and a battery, then he ordered his army to continue its march towards Kishegyes. 

According to the military historian József Bánlaky, Guyon, who was informed about the forthcoming attack, organized a champagne party, waiting for the Austrian troops to show up, and in order to make Jelačić more confident and careless, he didn't even send patrolling units that night, but he put his troops to wait in their positions with weapons in hands, in the darkness the showing up of the enemy. According to another military historian, Róbert Hermann, the patrols weren't sent out because Guyon wasn't expecting an attack.

From the Hungarian troops who were in that region, only General Richard Guyon's IV. corps took part in the battle of Kishegyes. Guyon's corps consisted of 61 infantry companies, 14 cavalry companies, 1485 (+ ?) horses, and 46 cannons; little more than 8360 soldiers. The division of General György Kmety did not arrive on the battlefield before the end of the battle. Kmety had 37 infantry companies, 8 cavalry companies, 832 saddled and 244 traction horses, as well as 17 cannons, in total 6603 soldiers.

Lieutenant General Jelačić marched to Kishegyes with 112 infantry companies, 30 cavalry companies, 4923 horses, and 73 cannons, in total 17,994 soldiers.

Battle
Around 3.00 a.m., one of the Hungarian outposts heard some suspicious noises, resembling to cannon rustle, so he reported this to his commander Antal Frummer, who ordered to shoot with their cannons towards that noise. The Austrian officers, instead of remaining quiet, started to scream orders to their subalterns, which being heard clearly by Frummer, ordered his artillerists to continue shooting at that direction, sending his skirmishers to attack. The sound of the shootings alerted the Hungarian troops, who started to light flares, then to shoot towards the enemy.   Jelačić's troops were hit from side, and although, because of the distance of the Hungarians, their shootings did not made many damages to his troops, the fact that they were discovered before they could accomplish their surprise attack, was very demoralizing to them.  Despite this the Ban of Croatia didn't gave up the hope of a victory, so he drew his troops in battle formation almost parallel to the Hungarian lines, as it follows: the Castiglione cuirassier brigade led by Lieutenant General Ferenc Ottinger represented the left wing, in the center stood the Dietrich division, with the Puffer brigade on its rights side slightly back, having the batteries positioned between the columns formed by the battalions, and on the right wing was constituted by the Horváth cavalry brigade and the imperial dragoons under his command. The second line was made by the infantry reserve led by Major General Daniel Rastić, and behind them the reminder of the artillery reserve was deployed.

After deploying his troops, Jelačić ordered to the Dietrich division to attack Kishegyes. He positioned the cavalry on the two sides, the Rastić brigade constituting the second line, while the Puffer brigade has to attack Szeghegy. As a response the Hungarians withdrew their advanced skirmishers, and unleashed a devastating cannonade on the attackers, which stopped the Austrian attack, forcing some units of the Budissavljević brigade to start a withdrawal, being saved only by the fact that the Hungarian right wing did not attack them. So the brigade finally stopped, and started a fire exchange with the Hungarians. Guyon sent two Hungarian infantry battalions to attack the right wing of the Ban, putting Puffer's brigade in danger. The Budissavljević brigade of the Dietrich division tried a new attack, in order to help the Puffer brigade, but when, with the support of the whole Hungarian artillery, another battalion joined the two Hungarian battalions, the attackers were forced again to retreat, and when the Hungarian cavalry from the right wing attacked the retreating imperials, they were stopped only by the salvos of the Licca battalion and the 4. battalion of the Ban's regiment. 

General Richard Guyon sent a portion of his infantry towards Szeghegy, in order to attack Jelačić's troops from the side, giving the leadership of the right wing to colonel Ágoston Tóth, he taking the lead of the left wing. In addition to the problems suffered on the battlefield, Jelačić was informed by his rearguards that 4 companies of Hungarian hussars, sallying from Feketehegy, approached towards the ammunition reserves of the Austrians, causing them to flee to Verbász. The Austrians were able to force the hussars to retreat to Feketehegy, only by sending four dragoon companies and a battery against them.  Although it became more and more obvious to Jelačić, that at any moment Guyon's troops can cut off his retreat to the Southern side of the Krivaja creek, he tried a last attack against the Hungarian positions, but the Dietrich divisions attack to crumbled in the heavy fire of the Hungarian artillery. Jelačić with the battalions he gathered, tried to withstand against the Hungarian attack, but the situation was deteriorating by minute: the Hungarian cavalry units from Kishegyes attacked the infantry of the Budissavljević brigade, the Puffer brigades flank was attacked from Szeghegy, and Hungarian units from Feketehegy tried to encircle Jelačić's army, and to cut off the Austrians retreat rout. Understanding the danger, the Ban of Croatia sent General Horváth with two battalions of infantry, 6 cavalry companies and three 12-pounder cannons towards Feketehegy, stopping the Hungarian attack, then he ordered his troops to start the retreat.

In the same day Colonel Bánffy, when he heard, from the other shore of the Tisza river, the cannonade from the direction of Kishegyes, with the Hungarian garrison from Écska and Aradác, attacked the enemy positions from Perlasz, threatening Titel, thus tying down the troops from there, preventing an eventual support of the Serbian troops from there to Jelačić's army. Although Bánffy did not succeed in occupying the enemy positions, his action indirectly helped the Hungarian troops from Kishegyes.

If the Austrian army would had not started its retreat, they would have been in danger of a total annihilation, do to the fact that Kmety's division of 6600 soldiers was marching towards Verbász, and if he would had chase away the Austrian garrison from Kula, they would remain without an escape rout. But the order given to Kmety was to reach Kula only on 15 July, and although his troops marched more than it was planned for that day (almost 25 km), they arrived only to Kerény, and their vanguard to Szivác. The military historian József Bánlaky thinks that Kmety, who heard the cannonade of the battle, could had still cut the retreat way of the Austrians if he would not insisted on the military plans made many days before. So Jelačić's troops reached Verbász relatively safe. Before continuing his retreat towards Titel. He, he left here five battalions and 24 cannons, which withheld the Hungarian artilleries attacks for two hours, suffering heavy losses, then they too retreated from here towards South, reaching the Danube, then crossing it to its right bank, and joining the siege corps South to the Hungarian fortress of Pétervárad. On 18 July, except the trenches of Titel, no imperial troops remained in Bácska.

Aftermath
In the battle, Jelačić's corps lost 985 (164 dead, 473 wounded, 348 missing or captured) soldiers and 191 (126 dead, 47 wounded, 18 missing or captured) horses. The Hungarian losses were 81 dead and 145 wounded, in total 226 soldiers.

After the battle of Kishegyes, the military initiative was again on the Hungarian side. Jelačić retreated in Szerémség, where he remained until the Hungarian main troops surrender on the fields of Szöllős. After the victory Lieutenant General Antal Vetter the main commander of the Hungarian forces, gave the order to his troops to advance South, and entered on 17 July in Pétervárad, where he installed his headquarters. He planned from there to break the Austrian encirclement of the southern side of the fortress, then to occupy Karlóca and Szalánkemén, which would enable him to starve out the defenders of the Titel plateau, but the War Ministry ordered him to attack Titel directly. On 23 July Guyon tried an attack against the plateau from many directions, but he was repelled. On the same day Vetter received the order to march with the IV corps to Szeged to reinforce the Hungarian troops from there, threatened by the approach of the main Austrian army led by Haynau, leaving behind only the division of Kmety. The IV corps started its marching on 25 July. On 31 July the government gave the order to Kmety to move with his troops on the left bank of the Tisza river, which he did on 3 August, ending with this the military operations from the Bácska region.

References

Sources

 

 
 

Conflicts in 1849
1849 in Hungary
Kishegyes
Kishegyes
Military history of Hungary
Hungarian Revolution of 1848
History of Bačka
Vojvodina under Habsburg rule